Moylagh may refer to:
 Moylagh, County Meath, Ireland
 Moylagh, County Tyrone, Northern Ireland